The following is an alphabetical list of members of the United States House of Representatives from the state of Michigan.  For chronological tables of members of both houses of the United States Congress from the state (through the present day), see United States congressional delegations from Michigan.

Current members
As of January 2023

 : Jack Bergman (R) (since 2017)
 : John Moolenaar (R) (since 2015)
 : Hillary Scholten (D) (since 2023)
 : Bill Huizenga (R) (since 2011)
 : Tim Walberg (R) (since 2011)
 : Debbie Dingell (D) (since 2015)
 : Elissa Slotkin (D) (since 2019)
 : Dan Kildee (D) (since 2013)
 : Lisa McClain (R) (since 2021)
 : John James (R) (since 2023)
 : Haley Stevens (D) (since 2019)
 : Rashida Tlaib (D) (since 2019)
 : Shri Thanedar (D) (since 2023)

List of members

See also

List of United States senators from Michigan
United States congressional delegations from Michigan
Michigan's congressional districts

References
Website of Bentley Historical Library at the University of Michigan
U.S. Representatives 1837–2003, Michigan Manual 2003–2004

Michigan
 
United States representatives